Popeasca is a village in Ștefan Vodă District, Moldova.

Notable people
 Victor Osipov
 Chiril Cojocaru

References

External links

Villages of Ștefan Vodă District